The 1951 All-Ireland Senior Camogie Championship was the high point of the 1951 season in Camogie. The championship was won by Dublin who defeated Antrim by a 17-point margin in the final. The final was played at Croke Park.

Structure
London entered the championship at the quarter-final stage and beat Galway 3-4 to 2-2, with strong performances from Nora Scully, Kathleen Waters, Noreen Collins and Bridie Ennis. They lost heavily in the semi-final at New Eltham with Deirdre O’Gorman,
Moya Forde and Peg Dooey leading Antrim’s effort.

Final
Sophie Brack scored 4-2 for Dublin in the final. Unaccustomed to the surroundings of Croke Park surroundings the Antrim team did not find their feet until near the end of the first half, by which time Dublin had run up a big score and led 5-3 to 0-1. Antrim did better after half time, their forwards played with more confidence and scored three goals in the opening minutes of the second half and four in all, two from Mary McKeever, and one each from Sarah O'Neill and Madge Rainey. The match was played on front of what was described as a “large attendance” and according to the Irish Independent“The colours were lavishly displayed by the supporters, the sky-blue of Dublin contrasting with the saffron and white of the Ulster supporters.”
The newspaper commented:“In Eileen Duffy the winners had a goalkeeper whose anticipation and clearances must surely have disconcerted the most goal hungry forward line. At times she was inspired, one of her saves being superb.”
The Irish Press reports:“The game as a whole failed to reach the heights expected following last year’s great tussle between the teams. Antrim in particular were disappointing, their defence being very lax, especially in the first half.”

Final stages

 
MATCH RULES
50 minutes
Replay if scores level
Maximum of 3 substitutions

See also
 All-Ireland Senior Hurling Championship
 Wikipedia List of Camogie players
 National Camogie League
 Camogie All Stars Awards
 Ashbourne Cup

References

External links
 Camogie Association
 Historical reports of All Ireland finals
 All-Ireland Senior Camogie Championship: Roll of Honour
 Camogie on facebook
 Camogie on GAA Oral History Project

1951 in camogie
1951